James W. York Jr. (born July 3, 1939 in Raleigh, North Carolina) is an American mathematical physicist who contributed to the theory of general relativity. In any physical theory, it is important to understand when solutions to the fundamental field equation exist, and answering this question has been a theme of York's scientific work, with Yvonne Choquet-Bruhat, of formulating the Einstein field equation as a well-posed system in the sense of the theory of partial differential equations.

York earned his B.Sc. in 1962 and his Ph.D. in 1966 from North Carolina State University.

York used conformal geometry in the initial value problem, and introduced concepts now called the York curvature and York time.

York is a recipient of the Dannie Heineman Prize for Mathematical Physics from the American Physical Society, where he is a Fellow.

See also
Gibbons–Hawking–York boundary term

References 

 
 
 
 

1939 births
Living people
21st-century American physicists
Mathematical physicists
American relativity theorists
North Carolina State University alumni
Princeton University faculty
University of North Carolina at Chapel Hill faculty
Cornell University faculty
Fellows of the American Physical Society